The Otvorskoye peat railway is located in Kirov Oblast, Russia.

Current status 
Otvorskoye peat railway emerged in the 1964s, in the area Kotelnichsky District, in a settlement named Svetlyi. The railway was built for hauling peat and carrying workers to and from the peat extraction. Peat is transshipped on broad-gauge  rail line and taken to Kirov, Sharyu, to a combined heat and power (CHP) station.

Rolling stock

Locomotives 
TU4 – № 1335, 1387, 2187, 2188, 2923
TU6D – № 0201
ESU2A – № 436

Railroad car
Boxcar
Flatcar
Tank car
Snowplow
Crane (railroad)
Tank car – fire train
Passenger car (rail)
Track laying cranes
Open wagon for peat
Hopper car to transport track ballast

See also

Narrow-gauge railways in Russia
Gorokhovskoye peat railway
Pishchalskoye peat railway
Dymnoye peat railway

References and sources

External links

 Official Website (Russian language)
Photo - project «Steam Engine» (Russian language)
«The site of the railroad» S. Bolashenko (Russian language)

750 mm gauge railways in Russia
Rail transport in Kirov Oblast